Maidment is an English-language surname. Notable people with the name include:

Ben Maidment (born 1988), English rugby union player
Charlie Maidment (1844–1926), British jockey
Colin Hyde Maidment (1908–1955), Irish badminton player and official
Cyril Maidment (1929–2004), British speedway rider
Dai Maidment, Welsh rugby league player
Harold Maidment (1906–1977), British sprint canoer
James Maidment (1793–1879), British antiquary and collector
Jane Maidment, New Zealand professor of social work
Jimmy Maidment (1901–1977), English footballer
Susannah Maidment, British palaeontologist

Tom Maidment (1905–1971), English footballer

English-language surnames
Surnames of English origin